Petri Helin (born 13 December 1969) is a Finnish former footballer. Helin played for several clubs in Finland, Denmark, England and Turkey. He was capped 27 times for the Finnish national team.

Honours 
Finnish Championship: 1990, 1992, 1997

Sources 
Veikkausliiga player statistics

1969 births
Finnish footballers
Finnish expatriate footballers
Finland international footballers
FC Jazz players
Helsingin Jalkapalloklubi players
Ikast FS players
Viborg FF players
PK-35 Vantaa (men) players
Luton Town F.C. players
Denizlispor footballers
Stockport County F.C. players
FC Jokerit players
Veikkausliiga players
Danish Superliga players
Süper Lig players
English Football League players
Living people
Association football defenders
Association football midfielders
Footballers from Helsinki